Yurii Vandiuk (born 7 May 1994) is a Ukrainian sprint canoeist. He is 2021 world champion, a silver medalists of the 2018 World Championships and a bronze medalist of the 2022 World Championships. He is also a silver medalist of the 2018 European Championships.

References

External links

Ukrainian male canoeists
Living people
ICF Canoe Sprint World Championships medalists in Canadian
Canoeists at the 2019 European Games
European Games medalists in canoeing
European Games silver medalists for Ukraine
Canoeists at the 2020 Summer Olympics
Olympic canoeists of Ukraine
1994 births
Sportspeople from Kyiv
21st-century Ukrainian people